Jerry Lee Prevo (born January 12, 1945) is an American academic administrator and retired Baptist minister. As of 2023, he is the president of Liberty University.

Early life and education 
Prevo was born on January 12, 1945, in Oak Ridge, Tennessee, to Milan and Aray Phillips Prevo. He graduated from Baptist Bible College. He did graduate work at Belmont University, Tennessee Temple University, the University of Tennessee, and Chapman College. A Doctor of Divinity degree was conferred on him by Hyles–Anderson College.

Career 
For 47 years, Prevo was a pastor at the Anchorage Baptist Temple in Anchorage, Alaska. In January 1980, he founded Alaska's chapter of the Moral Majority and began to boost Republican politicians. Upon his retirement from the Anchorage Baptist Temple in March 2019, the Anchorage Daily News referred to him as the city's "loudest evangelical voice."

In 2020, Prevo was serving as chairman of the board of trustees of Liberty University when controversial photos of Jerry Falwell Jr. came to light. After Falwell resigned, Prevo was selected by the university's executive committee to serve as the school's interim president.

References 

Living people
Baptist Bible College (Missouri) alumni
Liberty University faculty
Liberty University people
Baptist ministers from the United States
1945 births
People from Oak Ridge, Tennessee